Florian Vijent (28 November 1961 – 7 June 1989), was a Dutch football goalkeeper. During his career he played for Telstar. He died at the age of 27, when on 7 June 1989, he was killed in the Surinam Airways Flight PY764 air crash in Paramaribo. He is not related to Ed Vijent.

Vijent's large build was one of the reasons he became a goalkeeper. At the end of the 1988-89 season he was named as "Best goalkeeper of the season" in the Eerste Divisie. Vijent resembled AFC Ajax goalkeeper and close friend Stanley Menzo, who often borrowed Vijent's drivers license.

Together with Menzo and teammate Radjin de Haan he was invited by Sonny Hasnoe, the founder of the Colourful 11, to be part of the team and travel to Suriname to play in the "Boxel Kleurrijk Tournament" against three Surinamese teams. Although Menzo was instructed to not participate in the tournament by Ajax, he defied his club, booking an earlier flight to Suriname. On 7 June 1989, Surinam Airways Flight PY764 crashed during approach to Paramaribo-Zanderij International Airport, killing 176 of the 187 passengers on board, including Vijent, making it the worst ever aviation disaster in Suriname's history. Of the 18-member Colourful 11 team, only De Haan and two other team members survived the accident.

Vijent's younger brother Patrick was facing psychological problems even before Florian's death. His problems, however, merely worsened after Florian's death and only a few days after the accident he committed suicide by throwing himself in front of an oncoming train.

References
 Vijent at AndroKnel.nl 
 Crash report
 Iwan Tol: Eindbesteming Zanderij; het vergeten verhaal van het Kleurrijk Elftal 

1961 births
1989 deaths
Footballers from Amsterdam
Dutch footballers
Dutch sportspeople of Surinamese descent
SC Telstar players
Eerste Divisie players
Association football goalkeepers
Footballers killed in the Surinam Airways Flight 764 crash